NGC 4608 is a barred lenticular galaxy located in the constellation of Virgo. The galaxy was discovered by astronomer William Herschel on March 15, 1784. At about 56 million light-years (17.3 megaparsecs) away, it is a member of the Virgo Cluster.

Physical characteristics
NGC 4608 has a very well-defined bar. Surrounding the bar, there is an inner ring that is defined by a sharp inner edge. Outside of the inner ring, there is a low surface brightness disk that contains weak spiral features.

The center of NGC 4608 is a classical bulge, which is a bulge similar to an elliptical galaxy. The disk in NGC 4608 is practically considered non-existent. One explanation is that the bar in the galaxy was able to form without a disk. Another explanation says that a weak bar forms initially. Over time, the bar grows by causing the external disk to lose angular momentum therefore funneling material toward the bulge. Then the bar would be surrounded by a halo with very little or no disk left.

See also 
 List of NGC objects (4001–5000)
 NGC 4477
 NGC 4340

References

External links

Barred lenticular galaxies
Virgo (constellation)
4608
42545
7842
Astronomical objects discovered in 1784
Virgo Cluster